Hautes Études Commerciales (HEC) may refer to one of several business schools, including the following.

Europe
HEC Paris, France
HECJF, France
HEC Lausanne, Switzerland
HEC Geneva, Switzerland
HEC Management School – University of Liège, Belgium
ICHEC Brussels Management School, Belgium
EDHEC Business School, France, England and Singapore

Elsewhere
HEC Alger, Algeria
HEC Yaoundé, Cameroun
HEC Montréal, Canada
HEC Maroc, Morocco
IHEC Carthage, Tunisia